Thomas Meluch (born August 4, 1984) is an American multi-instrumentalist, writer, and photographer, best known by his pseudonym Benoît Pioulard.

His music signed to Kranky Records.

Biography 
Meluch began documenting field recordings and his own lo-fi compositions on dictaphones, discarded stereos and four-track machines in the mid 1990s, later focusing on highly limited CD-R and cassette releases of his experimental, folk-influenced songs for friends and family.

His first recordings as Benoît Pioulard appeared on the Random Number...Colors Start compilation released by the Ann Arbor-based Moodgadget label in 2004. After 2005's Enge EP Meluch was signed to Chicago's Kranky imprint, for whom he recorded the albums Précis (2006),Temper (2008), Lasted (2010), Hymnal (2013), Sonnet (2015), and The Benoit Pioulard Listening Matter (2016), as well as  Lignin Poise (2017) for Beacon Sound, and Sylva (2019) for Morr Music.

In 2010, Meluch formed Orcas with minimalist composer Rafael Anton Irisarri.  The duo's self-titled debut was released in April 2012 on Germany's Morr Music imprint, and its follow-up Yearling was released in early 2014.

Meluch lives in Brooklyn, New York.

Discography

Solo 
Blurred CD-R (self-released, 2001)
Clear CD-R (self-released, 2001)
Skymost CD-R (self-released, 2003)
Enge 7-inch EP (Moodgadget, 2005)
Dakota / Housecoat CD-R (self-released, 2006)
Précis CD (Kranky, 2006)
Fir 7-inch EP (Type, 2007)
Temper LP (Kranky, 2008)
Lee 7-inch (Hall Of Owls, 2008)
Flocks 7-inch (Blue Flea, 2009)
Lasted LP (Kranky, 2010)
Plays Thelma EP (Desire Path Recordings, 2011)
Hymnal LP (Kranky, 2013)
Sonnet LP (Kranky, 2015)
Noyaux  EP (Morr Music, 2015)
Seize/Marre  EP (self-released, 2016)
The Benoit Pioulard Listening Matter (Kranky, 2016)
Radial CD-R (self-released, June 27, 2016)
Slow spark, soft spoke (Dauw, 2017)
Lignin Poise (Beacon Sound, 2017)
Persona (Mellotron, 2019)
Sylva (Morr Music, 2019)

Collaborations 
PERILS – PERILS (with Kyle Bobby Dunn), LP (Desire Path Recordings, 2015)
Deck Amber (with Ant'lrd) LP (Sounds et al, 2018)
Communiqué (with Jogging House) (self-released, 2022)

Appeared on 
Random Number...Colors Start (Moodgadget, 2004)
Idol Tryouts 2 (Ghostly International, 2006)
The Rorschach Suite (Moodgadget, 2006)
Four-beat Rhythm: The Writings of Wilhelm Reich  (Workshop, 2013)
Sensorimotor (track 6: "Witness") – Lusine (Ghostly International, 2017)

References

External links 
 Official website
 Bandcamp site
 Myspace page
 Kranky website
 Moodgadget website
  Press Play and Record interview

1984 births
Living people
American singer-songwriters
American experimental musicians
21st-century American singers